Aphnaeus adamsi is a butterfly in the family Lycaenidae. It is found in Cameroon and the south-central part of the Democratic Republic of Congo.

References

Butterflies described in 1954
Aphnaeus